Josina Ziyaya Machel (April 1976) is a human rights activist from Mozambique, who was listed on the BBC's 100 Women list for 2020. Her parents were Samora Machel, the first independent president of Mozambique, and humanitarian and politician Graça Machel (née Simbine); her step-father was Nelson Mandela. Machel founded the Kuhluka Movement which aims to end the stigma of domestic violence and support its survivors.

Early life 

Machel was born in Maputo in April 1976. She is the daughter of former Mozambican President Samora Machel and Mozambican politician and social activist Graça Machel, who later married South African politician Nelson Mandela. Her father had chosen the name of his first wife, the feminist activist Josina Machel, as a tribute to her. Machel's father died in a plane crash, which some consider to have been murder, when she was 10 years old. After her mother and Nelson Mandela began a relationship, Machel moved to South Africa and, following their marriage, became Mandela's stepdaughter.

Machel studied Sociology and Political Science at the University of Cape Town, then studied for an MSc from the London School of Economics, in the same discipline. Her MSc dissertation was entitled 'AIDS: Disease of Poverty or Patriarchy’. One output of her research was the publication of the article 'Unsafe sexual behaviour among schoolgirls in Mozambique: a matter of gender and class', which was published in the journal Reproductive Health Matters.

Activism 
In October 2015, her then partner Rofino Licuco, a Mozambican businessman, assaulted her so severely that one of her eyes had to be removed. At the time of the assault, Machel was threatened and intimidated by men connected to Licuco, as well as receiving threatening phone calls from Licuco himself. Despite this, in August 2020 the Court of Appeal in Mozambique overturned the guilty verdict against Licuco, on the grounds that there were no eyewitnesses. As of December 2020, Machel was yet to receive justice.

As a survivor of domestic abuse, Machel has turned her personal trauma into a collective struggle, by founding the Kuhluka Movement, which in txopi (one of the languages in Mozambique) means Reborn. The organisation aims to challenge gender-based violence in South Africa and provide safe spaces for survivors of domestic violence there.

She is also the co-founder of the insurance company Protect Her-Life which provides emergency help for women, through its insurance and emergency health packages.

Additionally, Machel is a trustee of the Graça Machel Trust. She is a director of the Samora Machel Documentation Centre. She has also worked for the ABC Atlas Mara in Mozambique and other international organizations, including the Emerald Group, and the Zizile Institute for Child Development.

Awards and honours 
Machel has been nominated for several awards and honours, including:

 "Trailblazer Award", awarded by American SOHO (Saving Orphans through Healthcare and Outreach) in 2016. 
Inaugural member of the Mama Albertina Sisulu 100 Women of Fortitude Group. 
 100 Women List, chosen by the BBC and published on 23 November 2020.

References

External links 
 TEDx: Male Violence Against Women: the next frontier in humanity

1976 births
Living people
Mozambican activists
University of Cape Town alumni
Alumni of the London School of Economics
Mozambican feminists
BBC 100 Women
People from Maputo
Children of national leaders